McClellan National Forest was established in Alabama by the U.S. Forest Service on December 22, 1924 with  from part of the Camp McClellan Military Reservation. On May 4, 1928 the executive order for its creation was rescinded and the forest was abolished.

References

External links
Forest History Society
Forest History Society:Listing of the National Forests of the United States Text from Davis, Richard C., ed. Encyclopedia of American Forest and Conservation History. New York: Macmillan Publishing Company for the Forest History Society, 1983. Vol. II, pp. 743-788.

Former National Forests that were military bases
Former National Forests of Alabama